The Tiki Bar is Open was singer-songwriter John Hiatt's sixteenth album released on September 11, 2001, the day of the 9/11 attacks. It was his last album with Vanguard Records. *Although they are uncredited, the album features backing band The Goners, the same cadre of friends who backed Hiatt in his 1988 release Slow Turning.

In the ninth song, Dale Earnhardt and his No. 3 car are mentioned in the lyrics as a tribute to him.

(CD Version does credit The Goners ie. Dave Ranson, Kenneth Blevins and Sonny Landreth)

Track listing
All tracks written by John Hiatt

"Everybody Went Low" – 3:20
"Hangin' Round Here" – 3:09
"All the Lilacs in Ohio" – 3:37
"My Old Friend" – 3:50
"I Know a Place" – 3:26
"Something Broken" – 3:12
"Rock of Your Love" – 3:15
"I'll Never Get Over You" – 3:38
"The Tiki Bar Is Open" – 4:40
"Come Home to You" – 3:52
"Farther Stars" – 8:49

Personnel
John Hiatt – guitar, piano, harmonica, mandolin, harmonium, vocals
Jay Joyce – guitar, keyboards, loops
Sonny Landreth – guitar
Dave Ranson – bass
Kenneth Blevins – drums, percussion
David Bianco – piano on "The Tiki Bar Is Open"
Julie Miller – backing vocals
New Reflections Men's Choir – backing vocals on "The Tiki Bar Is Open"

References

2001 albums
John Hiatt albums
Vanguard Records albums
Albums produced by Jay Joyce
Tiki culture